The  is a women's professional wrestling championship owned by the Pro Wrestling Wave promotion. The championship, which is situated at the top of Pro Wrestling Wave's championship hierarchy, was first announced on December 5, 2012. The inaugural champion was crowned on March 17, 2013, when Yumi Ohka defeated Kana in the finals of a five-woman tournament.

There have been nineteen reigns shared among twelve wrestlers. Hikaru Shida is the current champion in her second reign.

History 
On December 5, 2012, Pro Wrestling Wave's founder and booker Gami announced the creation of the Wave Single Championship. Prior to the announcement, Wave, which was founded in August 2007, had no singles championships; instead the annual Catch the Wave tournament served as the promotion's top singles achievement.

Regina di Wave tournament 

Gami then announced that the inaugural champion would be determined in a four-woman single-elimination "Regina di Wave" tournament, which would include three former winners of Catch the Wave; Ayumi Kurihara (winner of the 2012 tournament), Kana (2011) and Yumi Ohka (2009), and the winner of a one-night Zan-1 tournament, a three-round tournament, which included a battle royal, a rock-paper-scissors round and a fan vote. Gami herself was also a former Catch the Wave winner from 2010, but decided not to put herself in the title tournament. On December 16, Misaki Ohata won the Zan-1 tournament to earn the fourth and final spot in the title tournament. On January 23, 2013, a random draw decided that in the first round of the tournament on February 17, Ayumi Kurihara would face Kana, while Misaki Ohata would face Yumi Ohka. The finals of the tournament were set to take place on March 17. On February 16, Wave announced that Kurihara had suffered a nasal and orbital floor fracture and would be forced to pull out of the tournament. She would be replaced by Mio Shirai, who had finished second in the Zan-1 tournament. In the following day's semifinal matches, Kana defeated Shirai, while Ohka defeated Ohata. However, it was announced that if Kurihara was able to return to the ring by March 17, she would get to wrestle Kana for a spot in the finals. On March 7, Kurihara announced that she was going to make her return for the match against Kana. In order to prevent Ohka from having the advantage of having to wrestle only one match on March 17, she was put in a non-tournament match against Gami. On March 17, Kana defeated Kurihara to hold on to her spot in the finals of the tournament. Later that same day, Ohka defeated Kana in the finals to win the tournament and become the inaugural Wave Single Champion.

Reigns 
Yumi Ohka was the inaugural. Ohaka's first reign was also the longest at 525 days, while Misaki Ohata's third reign aws the shortest, which lasted less than a day. Ohata also has the most reigns at three. Yuu Yamagata is the oldest champion at 39 years old, while Asuka is the youngest at 19 years old.

Hikaru Shida is the current champion at her second reign. She defeated Suzu Suzuki on August 14, 2022 at Wave 15th Anniversary ~ Carnival Wave in Tokyo, Japan.

Combined reigns 

References

External links 
 Pro Wrestling Wave's official website

Pro Wrestling Wave championships
Women's professional wrestling championships